Pennsylvania Real Estate Investment Trust is a publicly traded real estate investment trust that invests in shopping centers mostly in the Mid-Atlantic states.

History
The company was founded by Sylvan M. Cohen in 1960 as one of the first equity REITs. In 1997, the company acquired the Rubin Organization for $260 million. In 2001, founder Sylvan Cohen died. In 2003, the company acquired 6 shopping malls from The Rouse Company. The company also acquired Crown American. In 2006, the company acquired Woodland Mall for $177.4 million. In 2012, Joseph Coradino was named chief executive officer of the company.

In 2013, the company sold Christiana Center and Commons at Magnolia  for $87.3 million. In 2014, the company acquired a building in Philadelphia. In 2015, the company acquired Springfield Town Center for $465 million from Vornado Realty Trust. In 2016, the company sold 4 malls for $93 million. In 2019, the company turned Wyoming Valley Mall over to its mortgage holder, GS Mortgage Securities Trust, to avoid foreclosure after failing to find a buyer for the property. It owed $72.8 million on the loan, which had been in special servicing since July 2018. The mall had lost almost 75% of its 2014 $122 million value before being turned over.

The company filed for Chapter 11 bankruptcy protection on November 1, 2020, and exited bankruptcy protection on December 11, 2020.

Portfolio
According to a report from December 31, 2020, the company owned interest in 26 properties in 9 states containing 19.8 million square feet.

As of November 2022, PREIT owned the following notable properties:

References

External links

 
Financial services companies established in 1960
Real estate companies established in 1960
1960 establishments in Pennsylvania
Companies based in Philadelphia
Companies listed on the New York Stock Exchange
Real estate investment trusts of the United States
Shopping center management firms
Companies that filed for Chapter 11 bankruptcy in 2020
American companies established in 1960